The fifth season of Swedish Idol premiered on 3 September 2008 and continued until its grand finale on 12 December, when 22-year-old Kevin Borg was crowned winner. It was the first season to feature new judges Laila Bagge, Anders Bagge and Andreas Carlsson, a move that made it the first Idol series in the world to completely replace its judging panel. The series took advantage of guest judges including Charlotte Perrelli, Desmond Child and Cyndi Lauper, and the final 3 results show featured a performance by Leona Lewis, who sang "Forgive Me". For the second year running, the grand finale was held in Stockholm's Globen Arena with a live audience of 16,000 people, where operatic group Il Divo also sang live. Season 5 of Swedish Idol marked only the second time in worldwide Idol history where neither of the final two contestants were born in the show's home country. Winner Kevin Borg was born in Malta and runner-up Alice Svensson was born in Vietnam. The only other Idol contest to have this occur was Greece's Super Idol in 2004.

Judges
 Laila Bagge - Sony BMG manager
 Anders Bagge - Record producer
 Andreas Carlsson - Songwriter

Hosts
 Peter Jihde - Host during Idol and Idol Eftersnack
 Katrin Zytomierska - Host during Idol Eftersnack

Auditions
Auditions were held in the Swedish cities of Gothenburg, Luleå, Karlstad, Lund and Stockholm during the spring of 2008.

Eliminated Semi-finalists
Victoria Dogan - Eliminated 29 September
Rasmus Ingdahl - Eliminated 30 September
Linda Pritchard - Eliminated 1 October
Elias Ringquist - Eliminated 2 October
Jenny Karevik - Eliminated 3 October

Elimination chart

Finalist Song Choices

Idols 5 years celebration
 Kevin Borg - Natalie (Ola)
 Loulou Lamotte - Hurt (Christina Aguilera)
 Robin Bengtsson - Mercy (Duffy)
 Yazmina Simic - Don't Stop The Music (Rihanna)
 Lars Eriksson - You're Beautiful (James Blunt)
 Alice Svensson - These Words (Natasha Bedingfield)
 Jesper Blomberg - So Sick (Ne-Yo)
 Sepideh Vaziri - I Kissed A Girl (Katy Perry)
 Johan Palm - Viva La Vida (Coldplay)
 Anna Bergendahl - Release Me (Oh Laura)
 Robin Ericsson - It's My Life (No Doubt)

'90s
 Robin Ericsson - Angels (Robbie Williams)
 Yazmina Simic - Born to Make You Happy (Britney Spears)
 Anna Bergendahl - Nothing Compares 2 U (Sinéad O'Connor)
 Robin Bengtsson - Torn (Natalie Imbruglia)
 Johan Palm - Beautiful Ones (Suede)
 Lars Eriksson - One (U2)
 Sepideh Vaziri - (Everything I Do) I Do It for You (Bryan Adams)
 Loulou Lamotte - Stars (Simply Red)
 Kevin Borg - All I Wanna Do Is Make Love to You (Heart)
 Alice Svensson - Ironic (Alanis Morissette)

ABBA
 Loulou Lamotte - SOS
 Lars Eriksson - Money, Money, Money
 Alice Svensson - Lay All Your Love On Me
 Robin Ericsson - Waterloo
 Anna Bergendahl - Mamma Mia!
 Kevin Borg - Gimme! Gimme! Gimme!
 Robin Bengtsson - Does Your Mother Know
 Johan Palm - The Winner Takes It All
 Sepideh Vaziri - Dancing Queen

Schlager
Guest judge: Charlotte Perrelli
 Robin Bengtsson - När vindarna viskar mitt namn (Roger Pontare)
 Sepideh Vaziri - Främling - (Carola Häggkvist)
 Kevin Borg - Lyssna till ditt hjärta (Friends)
 Alice Svensson - Min kärlek (Shirley Clamp)
 Johan Palm - Johnny the Rucker (Magnus Uggla)
 Robin Ericsson - Michelangelo (Björn Skifs)
 Anna Bergendahl - Stad i ljus (Tommy Körberg)
 Lars Eriksson - Det börjar verka kärlek, banne mig (Claes-Göran Hederström)

Rock
Guest judge: Desmond Child
 Johan Palm - Poison (Alice Cooper)
 Lars Eriksson - Smells Like Teen Spirit (Nirvana)
 Anna Bergendahl - Save Up All Your Tears (Cher)
 Robin Ericsson - You Give Love a Bad Name (Bon Jovi)
 Robin Bengtsson - Dude Looks Like a Lady (Aerosmith)
 Alice Svensson - Heaven's on Fire (Kiss)
 Kevin Borg - Livin' on a Prayer (Bon Jovi)

Soul & Duets
Soul
 Kevin Borg - Signed, Sealed, Delivered I'm Yours (Stevie Wonder)
 Robin Ericsson - Reach Out I'll Be There (Four Tops)
 Robin Bengtsson - (Sittin' On) The Dock of the Bay (Otis Redding)
 Johan Palm - You Can't Hurry Love (The Supremes)
 Alice Svensson - I Say a Little Prayer (Dionne Warwick)
 Anna Bergendahl - Bleeding Love (Leona Lewis)

Duets

 Johan Palm & Robin Ericsson - We Built This City (Starship)
 Kevin Borg  & Anna Bergendahl - (I've Had) The Time of My Life (Bill Medley & Jennifer Warnes)
 Robin Bengtsson & Alice Svensson  - You're the One That I Want (John Travolta & Olivia Newton-John)

Love
 Robin Bengtsson - Let Me Entertain You (Robbie Williams) & Fields of Gold (Sting)
 Kevin Borg - If Tomorrow Never Comes (Ronan Keating) & In the Shadows (The Rasmus)
 Anna Bergendahl - Simply the Best (Tina Turner) & Over the Rainbow (Eva Cassidy)
 Johan Palm - I'll Stand By You (The Pretenders) & Friday I'm in Love (The Cure)
 Alice Svensson - Because of You (Kelly Clarkson) & Crazy In Love (Beyoncé)

Gospel
Guest judge: Carola Häggkvist
 Johan Palm - Long Train Runnin' (Doobie Brothers) & Free Fallin' (Tom Petty)
 Alice Svensson - Shackles (Mary Mary) & Independent Women (Destiny's Child)
 Kevin Borg - Higher and Higher (Jackie Wilson) & The Way You Make Me Feel (Michael Jackson)
 Robin Bengtsson - Joyful, Joyful (Lauryn Hill) & My Love Is Your Love (Whitney Houston)

Jury's choice
 Alice Svensson - Keep This Fire Burning (Robyn) & Girlfriend (Avril Lavigne)
 Robin Bengtsson - It's My Life (Bon Jovi) & Black or White (Michael Jackson)
 Kevin Borg - Livin' la Vida Loca (Ricky Martin) & Hot In Herre (Nelly)

Idol 2008 album

Det bästa från Idol 2008 (The Best from Idol 2008) is a sampling Swedish Idol 2008 shows.

References

2008 Swedish television seasons
Idol (Swedish TV series)
2008 in Swedish music